The 2022–23 Kerala Women's League season was the fourth season of the Kerala Women's League, the top division of the women's football league in the Indian state of Kerala. The season featured 10 teams with Kozhikode and Kochi as the venues. The season began on 10 August 2022.

Teams & locations

Personnel and sponsorship

Venues

Official partners

Standings 

 Promotion to Indian Women's League

Final

Season statistics

Goal scorers 
As of 18 September 2022
Note: Only top 10 players with most goals scored have been listed below. List of Goal Scorers in Kerala Women's League 2022-23.

Top assists
As of 18 September 2022
Note: Only top 10 players with most goals scored have been listed below. List of Goal Scorers in Kerala Women's League 2022-23.

Clean sheets 

As of 14 August 2022
Note: Only top 5 goalkeepers with most clean sheets have been listed below.

Awards

References 

2022–23 in Indian football leagues
2022–23 domestic women's association football leagues